Vanjari , is a town and union council of Mianwali District in the Punjab province of Pakistan. It is located near Kamar Mashani, which is a city of Mianwali District It is part of Isakhel Tehsil and located at 32°54'21N 71°14'47E and has an altitude of 268 m (882 ft).
Vanjari has a population of around 5000 and is a developing town.

References

Union councils of Mianwali District
Populated places in Mianwali District